Espiridion D. Laxa (December 18, 1929 – September 15, 2009) was a Filipino lawyer and film producer. He founded Tagalog Ilang-Ilang Productions and served as an official for several film festivals and associations.

Career
Laxa was a lawyer who was a senior partner at Laxa, Mapile & Associates. In the film world he served as an official for the Metro Manila Film Festival, the Philippine Motion Picture Producer Association, the Film Academy of the Philippines, and the Motion Picture Anti-Film Piracy Council Inc.

Filmography Tagalog Ilang-Ilang Productions (TIIP)
Mabuting Kaibigan, Masamang Kaaway (1991) starred Fernando Poe Jr. & Vic Vargas
Darna vs. the Planet Women (1975) starred Vilma Santos & Zandro Zamora
Darna and the Giants (1974) starred Vilma Santos, Divina Valencia, etc.
King Khayam and I (1974) starred Joseph Estrada, Vilma Santos, etc.
You Are My Destiny (1973) starred Victor Wood & Amapola (Maria Cabase)
Kampanerang kuba (1973) starred Vilma Santos, Edgar Mortiz, etc.
Mr. Lonely (1972)  starred Victor Wood & Amapola (Maria Cabase)
Don't Ever Say Goodbye (1972) starred Vilma Santos & Edgar Mortiz
Armalite Commandos (1968) No available information
Bigat ng kamay (1968) No available information
Karate Fighters (1968) starred Tony Ferrer, Victor Bravo, Daisy Romualdez
Masters of Karate (1968) starred Victor Bravo, Tony Ferrer, Gina Laforteza
Raton Ariel (1968) starred Anna Gonzales, Jess Lapid, Steve Alcarado, etc.
The Blackbelter (1968) starred Tony Ferrer, Eddie Garcia, Gina Laforteza, etc.
The Crimebuster (1968) starred Tony Ferrer, Eddie Garcia, Gina Laforteza, etc.
Labanang lalake! (1965) starred Joseph Estrada, Jess Lapid, Perla Bautista, etc.
Sa kamay ng mga kilabot (1965) starred Joseph Estrada, Larry Silva, etc.
Pambato (1964) starred Joseph Estrada and a full cast
Kung hindi ka susuko...! (1963) starred Fernando Poe Jr., Joseph Estrada, Max Alvarado
Isputnik vs. Darna (1963) starred Nida Blanca, Tony Ferrer, Liza Morena, etc.
Basagulero (1963) Max Alvarado, Joseph Estrada, Menchu Morelli.
Patapon (1963)  starred Joseph Estrada, Jess Lapid, Perla Bautista, etc.
Markang rehas (1962)  starred Joseph Estrada and Perla Bautista
Hari ng mga maton (1962) Joseph Estrada with a full cast
Tondo Boy (1962) starred Joseph Estrada, Melinda Molina, Max Alvarado, Vicente Liwanag.
Baril sa baril (1961) Fernando Poe Jr., Joseph Estrada, Perla Bautista, Isabelle Lopez.

Awards/citations
 Lifetime Achievement Award (Film Academy of the Philippines)
 Dr. Ciriaco Santiago Memorial Award (FAMAS)
 Manila's 1993 Awardee (Patnubay ng Sining at Kalinangan)
 Flavio Macaso Memorial Award (FAMAS)

Death
Espiridion Laxa died on September 15, 2009 of cardiac arrest related to prostate cancer. He was 79 years old.

References

1929 births
2009 deaths
Deaths from cancer in the Philippines
Deaths from prostate cancer
20th-century Filipino businesspeople
Filipino film producers
20th-century Filipino lawyers
Businesspeople from Manila
Place of birth missing
Place of death missing
Espiridion